"Felices los 4" is a song by Colombian singer Maluma from his third studio album, F.A.M.E. (2018). It was released by Sony Music Latin on 21 April 2017. The track was written by Maluma, Servando Primera, Mario Cáceres and Miky La Sensa, and produced by Rude Boyz. A salsa version of the song featuring American singer Marc Anthony and produced by Sergio George was released on 7 July 2017. "Felices los 4" became Maluma's first single as lead artist to appear on the US Billboard Hot 100, where it charted for 20 weeks and peaked at number 48.

Music video
Directed by Jessy Terrero, the accompanying music video follows a love triangle between Maluma, a married woman played by actress and model Natalia Barulich and her husband, portrayed by Wilmer Valderrama. On 5 May 2017, the singer received a Vevo certification because the video became the most watched Latin video worldwide within its first 24 hours.

As of May 2020, the video has been viewed more than 1.6 billion times.

Salsa version
A music video for the salsa version of the song featuring American singer Marc Anthony was released on 11 August 2017 and filmed in Miami's El Tucán and Marion. It was also directed by Terrero and the video continues the plot from the music video of the original version featuring Wilmer Valderrama and model and actress Priscilla Huggins.

Track listings
Digital download
"Felices los 4" – 3:49

Digital download –  EP edition
"Felices los 4" – 3:49
"Felices los 4"  – 3:34
"Felices los 4"  – 3:44
"Felices los 4"  – 3:50

Digital download – Salsa Version
"Felices los 4"  – 4:02

Charts

Weekly charts

Year-end charts

Decade-end charts

Certifications

Salsa version

Release history

See also
 List of number-one hits of 2017 (Argentina)
 List of airplay number-one hits of the 2010s (Argentina)
 List of Mexico Airplay number-one singles from the 2010s
 List of number-one songs of 2017 (Mexico)
 List of number-one singles of 2017 (Spain)
 List of Airplay 100 number ones of the 2010s
 List of Billboard number-one Latin songs of 2017

References

External links

2017 songs
2017 singles
Maluma songs
Marc Anthony songs
Spanish-language songs
Latin pop songs
Sony Music Latin singles
Sony Music Colombia singles
Song recordings produced by Sergio George
Number-one singles in Portugal
Number-one singles in Romania
Songs written by Maluma (singer)
Music videos directed by Jessy Terrero